Sarah Ferguson (born 1959), later Sarah, Duchess of York, is the former wife of Prince Andrew, Duke of York.

Sarah Ferguson may also refer to:

 Sarah Ferguson (politician) (1942–2022), Jersey politician
 Sarah Ferguson (journalist) (born 1965), Australian journalist 
 Sarah Jane Ferguson (born 1935), American former baseball player

See also 
Sarah (disambiguation)
Ferguson (disambiguation)